was a Japanese actress and singer. Born as Masako Kobayashi in Matsushiro, Nagano, Nagano Prefecture as the fifth daughter and last of nine children of Tohta Kobayashi, she was adopted by the Hasegawa family in Ueda at the age of six and in 1900 graduated Ueda school. She had to return to her birth family after her adopted father died, however in the year of her return, her natural father also died. At the age of 17 she moved to Tokyo.

She married in 1903 at the arrangement of relatives but divorced within a year.

In 1908 she married Seisuke Maezawa from the same country village and in 1909 joined Shoyo Tsubouchi's newly established theatre group only to divorce Maezawa the following October 1910.

Matsui first became famous in 1911 for her portrayal of Nora in A Doll's House. In 1913 after establishing the Geijutsu-za theatre troupe with the shingeki director Hogetsu Shimamura, she became an acclaimed actress thanks to her performance in the role of Katusha in Tolstoy's Resurrection (translated by Shimamura). "Katyusha's song", written by Shinpei Nakayama, which she sang in the film, became a huge hit selling over 20,000 copies at the time. This was said to be the first ryūkōka song.

After Shimamura died of the Spanish flu on November 5, 1918, she committed suicide by hanging on January 5, 1919.

It was Matsui's wish to be buried alongside Shimamura, with whom she had been having an affair. However, her wish was not to be granted and her grave lies with her family in her hometown of Matsushiro. Remains are also buried in the Tamon Temple in Shinjuku, Tokyo.

The movie The Love of Sumako the Actress was produced in 1947 based on her life.

References 

4.	^ (Japanese) “People of the Shinshu region”. Shinano Mainichi Newspaper. 1966

5.	“Modern Girls, Shining Stars, the Skies of Tokyo – 5 Japanese women”, Phyllis Birnbaum, 1999

External links 
 

1886 births
1919 suicides
20th-century Japanese actresses
Japanese stage actresses
Musicians from Nagano Prefecture
Suicides by hanging in Japan
20th-century Japanese women singers
20th-century Japanese singers
1919 deaths